Fábio da Rocha Vieira (born 12 June 1991) is a Portuguese professional footballer who plays for Florgrade FC as a midfielder.

Club career
Born in Porto, Vieira started his senior career in the lower leagues, with S.C. Esmoriz and S.C. Espinho. In 2013 he joined Vitória de Guimarães, being assigned to their reserves and helping them to promote to the Segunda Liga  in his first season.

Vieira played his first match as a professional on 9 November 2014, coming on as a late substitute in a 3–2 away win against C.D. Tondela. He scored his only goal in the second division the following 1 February, closing the 5–0 home victory over U.D. Oliveirense.

Vieira's last season in the second tier was 2016–17, when he failed to find the net and was also relegated with S.C. Freamunde.

References

External links

Portuguese League profile 

1991 births
Living people
Portuguese footballers
Footballers from Porto
Association football midfielders
Liga Portugal 2 players
Segunda Divisão players
S.C. Espinho players
Vitória S.C. B players
S.C. Freamunde players
Anadia F.C. players
F.C. Felgueiras 1932 players
S.C. Beira-Mar players
Lusitânia F.C. players
Cypriot Second Division players
Olympiakos Nicosia players
Portuguese expatriate footballers
Expatriate footballers in Cyprus
Portuguese expatriate sportspeople in Cyprus